At the 1974 British Commonwealth Games, the athletics events were held at the Queen Elizabeth II Park in Christchurch, New Zealand between 25 January and 2 February. Athletes competed in 37 events — 23 for men and 14 for women.

Medal summary

Men

Women

Medal table

Participating nations

 (61)
 (2)
 (5)
 (5)
 (30)
 (2)
 (66)
 (15)
 (2)
 (16)
 (1)
 (1)
 (4)
 (1)
 (5)
 (12)
 (1)
 (32)
 (6)
 (5)
 (2)
 (5)
 (59)
 (30)
 (11)
 (4)
 (26)
 (2)
 (3)
 (16)
 (4)
 (14)
 (15)
 (3)
 (2)

References
Commonwealth Games Medallists - Men. GBR Athletics. Retrieved on 2010-07-21.
Commonwealth Games Medallists - Women. GBR Athletics. Retrieved on 2010-07-21.

 
1974 British Commonwealth Games events
1974
British Commonwealth Games
1974 British Commonwealth Games